Sir Redmond Barry (1813–1880) was an Irish lawyer who served as judge of the Supreme Court of Victoria.

Redmond Barry may also refer to:
 Redmond Barry (died 1750), Irish MP
 Redmond Barry (lord chancellor) (1866–1913), Lord Chancellor of Ireland
 Redmond Barry (sportsman), Wexford hurling and football player of the 2000s
 Redmond Barry, title character of the 1844 novel The Luck of Barry Lyndon and its 1975 film adaptation Barry Lyndon